Jakica Gillies (née Ivancevic, ; born 11 June 1980) is an Australian psychic and reality television personality, best known for being on The Real Housewives of Melbourne.

Career 
Gillies works as a professional psychic. She is best known for her role in The Real Housewives of Melbourne, featuring as an original housewife.
Previously working in corporate banking as a casual relief teller, Gilles left her job to become a full-time psychic medium.

In January 2018, Gillies was revealed as a celebrity contestant on the fourth season of the Australian version of I'm a Celebrity...Get Me Out of Here!. On 6 March 2018, Gillies was evicted after 39 days in the jungle coming in 7th place.

Personal life 
Gillies was born in Croatia. Her family emigrated to Australia when she was a few weeks old . The family still has property in Croatia. Gillies spent her childhood and early adult life in Newcastle, but now resides in Melbourne.

Gillies married Silverchair drummer Ben Gillies in 2010.

After many failed IVF attempts, Jackie gave birth to twins on 15th October 2021 through a successful IVF procedure.

References

External links

1980 births
Living people
Australian psychics
Australian television personalities
Women television personalities
Croatian emigrants to Australia
Participants in Australian reality television series
The Real Housewives cast members
I'm a Celebrity...Get Me Out of Here! (Australian TV series) participants
The Real Housewives of Melbourne